Emma Bugbee (May 19, 1888 – October 6, 1981) was an American suffragist and journalist. She participated in and reported on the 1912 Suffrage Hike from New York City to Albany, New York.

Biography
She was born in Shippensburg, Pennsylvania. She later moved to New York. She graduated from Barnard College in 1909 and taught Greek courses at a high school in Methuen, Massachusetts. She became a reporter for the New York Tribune, later the New York Herald Tribune. She was the first woman report to be hired for the Heralds city room.

In 1914, she covered the Suffrage hike from Manhattan to Albany, New York. In 1976, she moved to Warwick, Rhode Island. She died on October 6, 1981, in Warwick, Rhode Island.

See also
List of suffragists and suffragettes
List of women's rights activists
Timeline of women's suffrage
Timeline of women's rights (other than voting)

References

1888 births
1981 deaths
20th-century American historians
American women journalists
Barnard College alumni
People from Methuen, Massachusetts
American political writers
Warwick, Rhode Island
American suffragists
American women's rights activists
People from Shippensburg, Pennsylvania
American women historians
20th-century American women writers
Historians from Pennsylvania
Historians from Massachusetts